Azerbaijan-Bosnia and Herzegovina relations refer to the bilateral relations between Azerbaijan and Bosnia and Herzegovina. Azerbaijan has a diplomatic office in Sarajevo. Bosnia and Herzegovina has a non resident ambassador in Ankara, Turkey.

Cooperation is carried out in such areas as economy, education, culture, healthcare, investment, energy, tourism, telecommunications, infrastructure, pharmaceuticals, etc.

Diplomatic relations 
The leader of diplomatic mission is Ismayil Jafarov.

The representative of Bosnia and Herzegovina in Azerbaijan is Bakir Sadovich.

Friendship groups operate in the legislative bodies of both countries

In 2012, the "Convention on the abolition of double taxation of profits and property and the suppression of tax evasion between the government of Azerbaijan and the Council of Ministers of Bosnia and Herzegovina" was signed

Economic cooperation 
A joint Azerbaijani-Bosnian business forum was held in Banja Luka in February 2013. The forum was attended by entrepreneurs working in such areas as the oil industry, banking, agriculture, construction, industry, tourism, etc.

In November 2017, the Azerbaijan–Bosnia and Herzegovina business meeting was held with the financial support of the Ministry of Economy of Azerbaijan and the Azerbaijan Export and Investment Promotion Fund (AZPROMO). The meeting was attended by more than 60 entrepreneurs working in such areas as agriculture, food industry, finance, industry, ICT, construction, textile industry, and services.

In 2017, the Foreign Trade chamber of Bosnia and Herzegovina and the Azerbaijan Export and Investment Promotion Fund (AZPROMO) signed a Memorandum of understanding.

In April 2019, the implementation of the Interconnector project on creating a pipeline infrastructure for the transportation of Azerbaijani gas (Shah Deniz-2) to Europe began in Bosnia and Herzegovina

Tourism 
In December 2014, the Council of Ministers of Bosnia and Herzegovina abolished the visa regime for Azerbaijani citizens Earlier, in 2012, the Government of Azerbaijan and the Council of Ministers of Bosnia and Herzegovina signed an agreement on the abolition of visas for persons holding diplomatic and service passports

Humanitarian assistance 
In September 2018, the opening ceremony of the emergency medical care center was held in the Bosnian city of Kotor Varoš with the financial support of the Heydar Aliyev Foundation.

On 23 April 2020, humanitarian aid was sent from Azerbaijan to Sarajevo to assist in the fight against coronavirus.

In May 2020, Azerbaijan sent financial assistance to the Ministry of Security of Bosnia and Herzegovina in the amount of 538,910 in the fight against the COVID-19 pandemic.

International cooperation 
In the international arena, cooperation between countries is carried out within the framework of various international organizations

The government of Bosnia and Herzegovina supports Azerbaijan in the Nagorno-Karabakh conflict.

In June 2013, the Parliament of Bosnia and Herzegovina adopted a resolution on Armenia's aggression against Azerbaijan and the Khojaly massacre.

Cultural ties 
In the early 1970-s, Baku and Sarajevo were declared twin cities.

In December 2018, an Azerbaijani delegation led by the Union of Municipalities of the Turkic World (TDBB) paid an official visit to Bosnia and Herzegovina. During this visit, the parties signed the "Project for the renovation of the Potokari memorial complex", according to which TDBB collaborated with the administration of the Srebrenica Potokari memorial complex. Then it was decided to reach an agreement between the municipality of Yasamal and the municipality of Novi Grad as twin cities.

The Bosnia and Herzegovina-Azerbaijan Friendship Association operates in Azerbaijan

In 2012, the "Agreement on cooperation in the field of education between the Ministry of education of Azerbaijan and the Ministry of Civil Affairs of Herzegovina and Bosnia" was signed.

See also 
Foreign relations of Azerbaijan
Foreign relations of Bosnia and Herzegovina

References 
 

 
 

 
Bosnia and Herzegovina
Azerbaijan